is a single by Japanese actress and recording artist Takako Matsu. Released as a single from her album Itsuka, Sakura no Ame ni..., it her most successful single recorded with Universal Music. It featured as the ending theme of the drama Omiai Kekkon, which features Matsu in the lead role.

Track listing

References

2000 singles
2000 songs
Japanese television drama theme songs
Japanese-language songs
Takako Matsu songs